Gantofta is a locality situated in Helsingborg Municipality, Skåne County, Sweden with 1587 inhabitants in 2011.

Sports
The following sports clubs are located in Gantofta:

 Gantofta IF

References 

Populated places in Helsingborg Municipality
Populated places in Skåne County